"A Day in the Death" is the eighth episode of the second series of the British science fiction television series Torchwood, which was broadcast on BBC Three on 27 February 2008.

The episode follows the dismissal and later readmission of the recently undead medical officer Owen Harper (Burn Gorman) to the alien-hunting team Torchwood.

Plot
Jack relieves Owen of his duties at Torchwood so Owen's state after being killed and resurrected three days ago can be examined. Martha assumes his position as Torchwood's medical officer, and Owen is given Ianto's job of making coffee. Martha concludes that Owen is 100% human yet will not age. The team discus a series of energy spikes coming from the estate of Henry Parker, a reclusive collector of alien artifacts. They devise a plan to find out the origin of the energy spikes, excluding Owen from the task.

Owen goes home. Toshiko arrives to keep him company, but Owen becomes angry when she offers to help. After insulting Toshiko, Owen intentionally breaks his finger (which cannot heal) to show her how "broken" he is, before attempting suicide. He fails to drown since he has no need for breath. At the Hub, the team realise that heat sensors on the Parker estate make it impossible for them to get inside. When Owen points out that he has no body heat, Jack agrees to take him on the mission.

After successfully entering the house, Owen reaches Parker, an old man linked up to many ventilators and medical machines after having three heart attacks. Parker says is being kept alive by a glowing object he calls the Pulse. Owen explains that it isn't keeping him alive; hope is doing the job. Owen promises to help Parker face his fear of death, but Parker suffers another heart attack. Unable to draw breath himself, Owen cannot perform CPR, and Parker dies. The energy from the Pulse is not as dangerous as originally thought; it was an alien species sending a reply to messages NASA sent into space in the 1970s, which appears as a beautiful light.

After Torchwood says farewell to Martha, Owen promises to tell Toshiko whenever he's feeling bad. Owen walks on a footpath, looks up and spots a woman called Maggie Hopley, who is ready to jump off a roof on the anniversary of her husband's death. Asking Maggie if she is ready to jump and revealing his undead state, Owen tells the story of his day to her as a frame story throughout the episode. He later takes the Pulse out of his backpack and shows it to Maggie as a way of showing her it does get better.

Continuity
One of Henry Parker's purchases was a Dogon Eye, an item last seen in "Random Shoes". The official website states that he has recently purchased a Cyberman arm and chest unit.
In the opening scene, archive footage of Louise Delamere as Diane Holmes, Owen's first series love interest, is shown. Also in the opening montage, clips from episodes such as "Everything Changes", "Ghost Machine", "Out of Time" and "Meat" can be glimpsed.
This is the second episode in which Owen is relieved of his duties. He was previously dismissed by Jack after he opened the rift in "End of Days".

Outside references
 Owen says that Torchwood filed Henry Parker as "Mostly Harmless," a reference to the book by the same name by Douglas Adams, who used to write for Doctor Who. "Mostly Harmless" was the revised entry for planet Earth in the Hitchhiker's Guide to the Galaxy, also written by Adams. The original entry for Earth was "harmless".
 Owen criticises Ianto for liking The Adventures of Tintin. Owen thinks Tintin is weird, and reckons "he was shagging the dog" (his pet Snowy). Later in the episode, Owen is given a Tintin T-shirt. Doctor Who writer Steven Moffat co-wrote the 2011 film The Adventures of Tintin.

Production

Cast notes 
Richard Briers previously played the Chief Caretaker and the voice of Kroagnon in the 1987 Seventh Doctor serial Paradise Towers.

Music
The song playing in Owen's apartment is "Atlas" by Battles.

References

References

External links

Torchwood episodes
2008 British television episodes
Doctor Who crossovers
Television episodes about death